Oreste Crisostomi  (born 21 August 1982), is an Italian filmmaker. He is particularly known as the writer and artistic director of the critically acclaimed documentary Fuori fuoco (Out of focus).

Personal life 
He was born and raised in Terni. Since 2011, he has been carrying out constant cultural activities with the inmates from Terni penitentiary, where he made the documentary Fuori fuoco.

Career 
He made his debut as a director and screenwriter in 2010 with the feature film Alice, previewed at the Flaiano Prizes, starring Catherine Spaak . During the 2011/12 season, he made the play Io as an author and director. The play is inspired by Pierre Rivière's memoir, a case of parricide from the 19th century. In 2013, he was appointed director of the Film Festival Popoli e Religioni.  In 2014 and 2015, he worked on the production of Asino, a documentary film by Anatoly Vasiliev. In 2018, his collective documentary project Fuori fuoco, made with the inmates from Terni penitentiary, was premiered at the Perugia International Journalism Festival, screened at the Chamber of Deputies and at the Festival dei Due Mondi. In 2021, he made the documentary Give Me the End You're At, a production of Associazione Museo Nazionale del Cinema, as a screenwriter and director.

Filmography

References

External links 
 
Oreste Crisostomi at Cinemaitaliano

Living people
Italian screenwriters
Italian film directors
Italian documentary filmmakers
1982 births